Dobbins Landing is a popular tourist area located at the edge of Presque Isle Bay at the terminus of State Street in Erie, Pennsylvania. Consisting of a wharf and adjoining facilities, the landing includes the Bicentennial Tower, the Sheraton Erie Hotel, and the Bayfront Convention Center.

The landing is named after Captain Daniel Dobbins, an early 19th-century sailing master in the U.S. Navy who supervised the construction of a squadron of warships used in the Battle of Lake Erie. During the summer months, the Presque Isle Water Taxi travels between Dobbins Land and Presque Isle State Park.

References

External links
 Weber Murphy Fox Case Study: Dobbins Landing
 Lat-Long.com
 Port Erie Touring

Docks (maritime)
Redeveloped ports and waterfronts in the United States
Economy of Erie, Pennsylvania